Gridenki is a rural locality (a village) in Starodubsky District, Bryansk Oblast, Russia. The population was 128 as of 2010. There are 3 streets.

Geography 
Gridenki is located 16 km northeast of Starodub (the district's administrative centre) by road. Melensk is the nearest rural locality.

References 

Rural localities in Starodubsky District